Walter Dale "Walt" Miller (October 5, 1925 – September 28, 2015) was an American politician and member of the Republican Party. He served as the 29th Governor of South Dakota from 1993 to 1995, having assumed the office upon the death of George S. Mickelson. He was, at age 67 upon taking office, the oldest person to serve as the Governor of South Dakota.

Biography
Miller was born in 1925 in the unincorporated community of Viewfield in Meade County, South Dakota near his family ranch, where he lived and worked throughout his life. He attended the South Dakota School of Mines and Technology but did not graduate. In addition to ranching, Miller was the president of the Dakota National Life Insurance Company from 1970 to 1985.

Career
From 1967 to 1986, Miller served in the South Dakota House of Representatives. From 1975 to 1978, and again in 1986, he served as House Majority Leader. Miller was Speaker of the House in 1981 and 1982. During his legislative tenure, he also served as Speaker Pro Tempore, Assistant Majority Leader, and Majority Whip.

In the 1984 presidential election, Miller was the state chair of the Reagan-Bush campaign, and in the 1988 presidential election he was the state co-chair of the Bush-Quayle campaign.

Miller served as the 34th Lieutenant Governor of South Dakota and its first full-time lieutenant governor from 1987 until Governor George S. Mickelson's death on April 19, 1993, when he assumed the governorship.
 
Miller lost the 1994 Republican gubernatorial primary to former two-term governor Bill Janklow.

Personal life
After leaving office, Miller continued to ranch north of New Underwood, on the boundary between Meade and Pennington counties, and resided part-time in Fort Pierre, where he was involved in various lobbying and ranching activities.

In 1943, he married Mary Randall, with whom he had four children: Nancy, Karey, Randy and Renee. Mary died in 1989. In 1993, Miller married Patricia Caldwell, becoming the first governor of South Dakota to marry while in office. He had two stepchildren, Cade and Rebecca. Patricia Caldwell Miller ran unsuccessfully for the Republican nomination for state auditor in 2010. She served as deputy secretary of state, and unsuccessfully sought the Republican nomination for secretary of state in 2014.

Miller died on September 28, 2015, at the age of 89, while visiting Dallas, Texas. He was buried in Viewfield.

References

External links 
Trail of Governors: Governor Walter Dale Miller
National Governors Association
 

|-

|-

1925 births
2015 deaths
Republican Party governors of South Dakota
Lieutenant Governors of South Dakota
People from Meade County, South Dakota
People from Fort Pierre, South Dakota
Ranchers from South Dakota
South Dakota School of Mines and Technology alumni
Speakers of the South Dakota House of Representatives
Republican Party members of the South Dakota House of Representatives